Dalla calaon is a species of butterfly in the family Hesperiidae. It is found in Ecuador.

References

Butterflies described in 1877
calaon
Hesperiidae of South America
Taxa named by William Chapman Hewitson